The Sense of Gender Awards are annual awards given by the Japanese Association for Gender, Fantasy & Science Fiction since 2001 for the science fiction or fantasy fiction published in the Japanese language in the prior year which best "explore and deepen the concept of Gender." An award is also given for works that have been translated into Japanese.

The organization that gives the award is known as the Japanese Association for Feminist Fantasy and Science Fiction. The award and organization were founded by science fiction critic Mari Kotani, professional SF reviewer Reona Kashiwazaki, and Noriko Maki, the chair of the Japanese science fiction fandom confederation. They are sometimes called the "Japanese Tiptree Awards".

Past winners include Fumi Yoshinaga, N. K. Jemisin, and Eileen Gunn.

List of winners
 Best Sense of Gender Award

 Best Sense of Gender Award in Translation

 Special Award

See also
 James Tiptree Jr. Award
 Nihon SF Taisho Award
 Seiun Award

References

External links
 

Fantasy awards
Japanese science fiction awards
Awards established in 2001
2001 establishments in Japan
Gender in speculative fiction